C. Allan Egolf (June 7, 1938 – September 10, 2021) was a Republican member of the Pennsylvania House of Representatives.

He was a 1956 graduate of Green Park Union High School. He earned a B.S. in education from Penn State University in 1961 and a B.S. equivalent in meteorology from Texas A&M University in 1967. In 1978, he earned a M.Ed. in meteorology and earth sciences from Penn State University.

He was first elected to represent the 86th legislative district in the Pennsylvania House of Representatives in 1992. He retired prior to the 2004 election. Egolf died on September 10, 2021.

References

External links
 official PA House profile (archived)

1938 births
2021 deaths
Republican Party members of the Pennsylvania House of Representatives
United States Air Force colonels
People from Carlisle, Pennsylvania
Military personnel from Pennsylvania